The 1902 Kentucky Derby was the 28th running of the Kentucky Derby. The race took place on May 3, 1902.  This marked the first year in which the race was held on its now-traditional day of Saturday; all prior races had taken place anywhere from Monday through Friday.

Full results

Payout
 The winner received a purse of $4,850.
 Second place received $700.
 Third place received $300.

References

1902
Kentucky Derby
Derby
1902 in American sports
May 1902 sports events